Michelle is a given name, originally a variant of Michèle, the French feminine form of Michel, derived from the Hebrew name Michael meaning "Who is like God?". It is now extensively used in English-speaking as well as French-speaking countries, partly influenced by the Beatles song of the same name. 

It is also a surname.

Variants and cognates

 Albanian: Miçel
 Arabic: ميشيل
 Armenian: Միշել
 Belarusian: Мішэль ( Mišeĺ)
 Bengali: মিশেল ( Miśēla)
 Bulgarian: Мишел, Микаела, Михаела
 Chinese Simplified: 米歇尔 (Mǐ xiē ěr)
 Chinese Traditional: 米歇爾 (Mǐ xiē ěr)
 Czech: Michaela, Michala
 Danish: Mikaela, Mikkeline
 Finnish: Mikaela
 French: Michèle
 Georgian: მიშელ (Mishel)
 German: Michaela, Michi
 Greek: Μιχαέλα
 Gujarati: મિશેલ ( Miśēla)
 Hebrew: מישל
 Hindi: मिशेल ( Miśēla)
 Hungarian: Mihaéla
 Italian: Micaela, Michela, Michelina, Lina
 Japanese: ミシェル ( Misheru)
 Kannada: ಮಿಚೆಲ್ (Micel)
 Khmer: មីឆែល (Mee-chael)
 Korean: 미셸 (Misyel)
 Marathi: मिशेल ( Miśēla)
 Mongolian: Мишээл ( Misheel)
 Norwegian: Mikaela
 Persian: میشل
 Polish: Michalina
 Portuguese: Micaela, Miguela
 Punjabi: ਮਿਸ਼ੇਲ ( Miśēla)
 Romanian: Mihaela
 Russian: Мишель (Mishel')
 Serbian: Мишел ( Mišel)
 Slovak: Michaela
 Slovene: Mihaela
 Spanish: Micaela, Miguela
 Swedish: Michaela, Mikaela
 Tamil: மைக்கேல் ( Maikkēl)
 Telugu: మిచెల్ ( Micel)
 Thai: มิเชล (Michel)
 Ukrainian: Михайлина (Mychajlyna)
 Urdu: مشیل
 Yiddish: מישעל ( Myşʻl)

Notable people named Michelle

As given name

A–J 
 Michelle Akers (born 1966), American footballer
 Michelle Andrews (born 1971), Australian field hockey midfielder
 Michelle Ang (born 1983), New Zealand actress
 Michelle Bachelet (born 1951), President of Chile
 Michelle Barr (born 1978), Scottish footballer
 Michelle Beadle (born 1975), American sportscaster
 Michelle Boisseau (1955–2017), American poet
 Michelle Branch (born 1983), American rock singer
 Michelle Caruso-Cabrera (born 1967), CNBC reporter
 Michelle Chamuel (born 1986), American singer
 Michelle Chandler (born 1974), Australian basketball player
 Michelle Chen (born 1983), Taiwanese actress
 Michelle Chong (born 1977), Singaporean actress and director
 Michelle Cliff (1946–2016), Jamaican-American author
 Michelle Collins (born 1962), English actress and television presenter
 Michelle Courtens (born 1981), Dutch singer, also known as "Michelle"
 Michelle Cruz (born 1992), American soccer defender
 Michelle Creber (born 1999), Canadian actress
 Michelle Dee (born 1995), Filipino beauty queen and actress
 Michelle Dilhara (born 1996), Sri Lankan actress
 Michelle Dockery (born 1981), English actress
 Michelle Duggar (née Ruark), American reality TV star
 Michelle van Eimeren (born 1972), Australian model and beauty queen
 Michelle Fairley, Northern Irish actress
 Michelle Ferrari (born 1983), Italian pornographic actress and television personality
 Michelle Forbes (born 1965), actress
 Michelle Fournier (born 1977), Canadian hammer thrower
 Michelle Gayle (born 1971), English singer and actress
 Michelle Gildernew (born 1970), Sinn Féin Politician
 Michelle Gomez (born 1966), Scottish actress
 Michelle Groskopf, street photographer
 Michelle Jenner (born 1986), Spanish actress

H–M 

 Michelle Hamer, Australian visual artist
 Michelle Hardwick (born 1976), English actress
 Michelle Heaton (born 1979), British singer, TV personality and glamour model
 Michelle Hodkin, American author
 Michelle Hunziker (born 1977), Swiss television hostess, actress and fashion model
 Michelle Jaggard-Lai (born 1969), retired to professional tennis player from Australia
 Michelle Jin (born 1974), professional Chinese American bodybuilder 
 Michelle Keegan (born 1987), English actress
 Michelle Kwan (born 1980), American figure skater
 Michelle Laine, American fashion designer
 Michelle Langstone (born 1979), New Zealand actress
 Michelle Larcher de Brito (born 1993), Portuguese tennis player
 Michelle Leonard (born 1973), British singer and songwriter, now based in Berlin
 Michelle Leslie (born 1981), Australian model
 Michelle Lombardo (born 1983), American model and actress
 Michelle Lujan Grisham (born 1959), American lawyer and politician
 Michelle Madhok (born 1971), CEO of White Cat Media LLC
 Michelle Malkin (born 1970), American political columnist
 Michelle Marsh (born 1982), British Page Three girl
 Michelle McCool (born 1980), American retired professional wrestler and former middle school teacher
 Michelle McManus (born 1980), Scottish pop singer who won Pop Idol
 Michelle McLean (born 1972), former Miss Universe (1992) from Namibia
 Michelle Meldrum (1968–2008), guitarist
 Michelle Meunier (born 1956), French politician
 Michelle Christina Cerqueira Gomes Lopes (born 1989), Brazilian footballer
 Michelle Monaghan (born 1976), American actress
 Michelle Mone, Baroness Mone (born 1971), Scottish entrepreneur and parliamentarian
 Michelle Monkhouse (1991–2011), Canadian fashion model

O–Y 
 Michelle Obama (born 1964), Former First Lady of the United States of America
 Michelle Odinet, American lawyer
 Michelle Ongkingco (born 1978), American actress
 Michelle Payne (born 1985), Australian jockey and horse trainer
 Michelle Pfeiffer (born 1958), American actress
 Michelle Phillips (born 1944), American actress, singer, and member of The Mamas & the Papas
 Michelle Rodriguez (born 1978), American actress
 Michelle Rohl (born 1965), American race walker
 Michelle Rojas (born 1987), American voice actress
 Michelle Ruff, American voice actress
 Michelle Ryan (born 1984), British actress
 Michelle Sawatzky-Koop (born 1970), Canadian volleyball player
 Michelle Senlis (1933–2020), French lyricist
 Michelle Ray Smith (born 1974), American actress
 Michelle Stephenson (born 1977), English singer-songwriter, known as ex member of the Spice Girls
 Michelle Thrush (born 1967), Canadian actress
 Michelle Tokarczyk (born 1953), American author and poet
 Michelle Trachtenberg (born 1985), American actress
 Michelle Triola (1933–2009), American actress
 Michelle Visage (born 1968), American media personality and judge on RuPaul's Drag Race
 Michelle Wie (born 1989), American golfer
 Michelle Williams (actress) (born 1980), American actress
 Michelle Williams (singer) (born 1979), American R&B artist from singing group Destiny's Child
 Michelle Wright (born 1961), Canadian country music artist
 Michelle Yeoh (born 1962), Malaysian-born Hong Kong actress
 Michelle Yim (born 1956), Hong Kong actress

As stage name  
 Michel'le (born 1970), hip hop artist in the 1980s and 1990s
 Michelle (born 1972), German singer

As surname  
 Candice Michelle (born 1978), American model, actress and retired professional wrestler
 Cara Michelle, American Playmate-of-the-month and actress
 Janee Michelle (born 1946), American actress
 Vicki Michelle (born 1950), British actress best known for playing as Yvette Carte-Blanche from the British sitcom 'Allo 'Allo!

Fictional characters
 Michelle, the character from The Next Step, former member of A-Troupe and studio head, played Victoria Baldessara.
 Michelle Connor in the British soap opera Coronation Street
 Michelle Corrigan in the British soap opera Doctors
 Michelle Chang in the Tekken series of fighting games
 Michelle Dessler in the TV series 24
 Michelle Dubois in the TV series ''Allo 'Allo!
 Michelle Flaherty in the American Pie film series
 Michelle Fowler in the British soap opera EastEnders
 Michelle Peng in Juken Sentai Gekiranger
 Michelle Richardson in the TV series Skins
 Michelle Scully in the Australian soap opera Neighbours
 Michelle Tanner in the TV series Full House
 Michelle Jones (MJ) in the Marvel Cinematic Universe film series

See also
 Michele
 Michela
 Michel (name)
 Shelley (name)

References

French feminine given names
English feminine given names
Feminine given names